Edwin Buliba Angaba is a Kenyan defender who turns out for Kenyan Premier League side Nairobi City Stars

Career
Buliba, a Kakamega High and Kamukunji High School alumnus, formerly turned out for Kawangware-based Vapor Sports before joining Nairobi City Stars in 2017. He is one of the players who stayed on at the club upon promotion to the premier league at the end of the 2019–20 National Super League. 

Buliba was handed his Kenyan Premier League debut by head coach Sanjin Alagic in the second game of the 2020/21 season against KCB on 4 December 2020 in Kasarani when he came on as a second-half substitute. He went on to earn a total of eight games as a substitute in his first topflight season.

He earned his first start Premier league start under coach Nicholas Muyoti against Nzoia Sugar in Ruaraka on 8 December 2021 and went on to register a total of eight in the 2021–22 season.

Honours

Club
Nairobi City Stars
National Super League
 Champions (1): 2019–20

References

2000 births
Living people
Kenyan footballers
Nairobi City Stars players
Kenyan Premier League players